Borjomi (Borjomis munitsip’alit’et’i) is a municipality in southern Georgia, in the region of Samtskhe-Javakheti with a population of 24,998 (2021). Borjomi municipality is located on the territory of the historical Tori.

Geography and climate

Borjomi municipality borders Akhaltsikhe in the southwest, Aspindza and Akhalkalaki in the south, Tsalka in the east, Kharagauli, Khashuri, Kareli Municipality and Gori Municipality in the north. The municipality consists in large part of subranges of the Lesser Caucasus mountains, the western end of the Trialeti Range and the eastern end of the Meskheti Range which are separated by the Borjomi Gorge through which the Mtkvari river flows.

Within the municipality, there are branches of the Trialeti Range - the Gvirgvini range and Tsikhisdzhvari, the peaks of which reach 2000-2850 meters above sea level. Between the main ridge of the Trialeti Range and the Gvirgvini subrange the Tory basin is located. The municipality is lying on both sides of the Mtkvari River. From the right side merges the Bordjomula and Gujaretistskali. Rivers are used for both irrigation and energy purposes. There are many lakes in Borjomi. Among them, Tabatskuri and Kahisi, in addition to beauty, are also rich in precious fish. The region has many mineral springs, which are its main fossil wealth. The municipality of Borjomi is located at the transition place between continental subtropics and marine subtropics with a transitional climate with cold winters and long summers. The average annual temperature in January is -3 - -6 ° C; and in August 14-18 ° C.

Administrative divisions
Borjomi municipality is administratively divided into 11 administrative units (communities, თემი, temi), these include Akhaldaba, Bakuriani, Balanta, Borjomi, Dviri, Tabatskuri, Tadzrisi, Tba, Kvibisi, Tsikhisdzhvari, Tsagveri. The municipality has one city (the municipal centre Borjomi), three daba (Akhaldaba, Bakuriani, Tsagveri) and 40 villages (სოფელი, sopeli). In 2018 the borough (daba) Bakurianis Andeziti wad downgraded to village. 

 City: Borjomi
 Boroughs: Akhaldaba, Bakuriani, Tsagveri
 Villages: Bakurianis Andeziti, Didi Mitarbi, Patara Mitarbi, Sakochavi, Tsemi, Patara Tsemi, Daba, Timotesubani, Mzetamze, Balanta, Chirakhula, Gverdisubani, Vardevani, Machartsqali, Ghvtismshobeli, Tsinubani, Gujareti, Odeti, Ghinturi, Tsitelsopeli, Dviri, Kvabiskhevi, Chitakhevi, Chobiskhevi, Tabatskhuri, Moliti, Tadzrisi, Dgvari, Sakire, Tba, Libani, Sadgeri, Qvibisi, Vardgineti, Zanavi, Kortaneti, Rveli, Tsikhisjvari

Politics
Borjomi Municipal Assembly (Georgian: ბორჯომის საკრებულო, Borjomi Sakrebulo) is the representative body in Borjomi Municipality, consisting of 33 members which are elected every four years. The last election was held in October 2021. Otar Arbolishvili of Georgian Dream was elected mayor.

Population 
By the start of 2021 the population was determined at 24,998 people, a minor decrease compared to the 2014 census.

The vast majority (87%) of the population of Akhalkalaki is Georgian. The largest ethnic minority by far are the Armenians (8.6%). Other minorities include Ossetians (1.3%), Greeks (1.2%), Russians (1.1%), Ukrainians (0.3%) and minimal numbers of Azerbaijanis, Jews, Assyrians and Abkhazians. In terms of religion, more than 94% of the population consists of followers of the Georgian Orthodox Church and 3.9% are followers of the Armenian Apostolic Church, followed by Jehovah's Witnesses (0.5%), and a few dozen Catholics and Muslims.

Tourism and Historical sites

Cultural monuments
 Green Monastery
 Timotesubani Monastery
 Potoleti Church
 Daba St. George’s Church
 Peter’s Castle
 Dviri Fortress

Nature
 Borjomi-Kharagauli National Park
 Nedzvi National Park
 Lomis mta
 Kakhisi Lake
 Tsero Lake
 Meghruki Gorge

Resorts
 Borjomi
 Bakuriani
 Likani
 Mitarbi
 Kokhta
 Tsikhisdzhvari
 Tsemi
 Tsagveri

See also 
 List of municipalities in Georgia (country)

External links 

 Website Borjomi Municipality (inactivated February 2022)

References

Municipalities of Samtskhe–Javakheti